Overthorpe is a neighbourhood in Thornhill near Dewsbury in Kirklees, West Yorkshire, England. Historically, it is part of the West Riding of Yorkshire.

See also
Listed buildings in Dewsbury

Geography of Dewsbury